The Star Maker or Starmaker may refer to:

Film
The Star Maker (1939 film), American musical comedy
The Star Maker (1968 film), American-German drama starring Wendell Corey
The Star Maker (1981 film), American drama starring Rock Hudson
The Star Maker (1995 film), Italian drama; Oscar nominee

Television
"The Star Maker", 1957 episode of American TV sitcom (List of The George Burns and Gracie Allen Show episodes)
"Star Maker", British 1974 teleplay; music adapted for Soap Opera (album) 
Star Maker (Sailor Moon), character on 1991–97 Japanese manga series
"Star Maker", 2006 episode of British TV serial Holby City (series 8)
Starmaker (2009 TV series), American musical reality MTV series, starring P. Diddy

Literature
Star Maker, 1937 science fiction novel by English philosopher Olaf Stapledon
Star Maker, 1959 biography of D. W. Griffith by American author Homer Croy
Starmaker: Leviathan, British comic created by Adam Hamdy; published in 2009

Music
"Starmaker", a 1982 single by The Kids from "Fame" from the album of the same name
"Star Maker", 1990 song by Dutch pop artist Diana van Berlo
"Starmaker", 2012 solo album by American saxophonist Lou Marini
The Star Maker, business name of Egyptian music producer Nasr Mahrous

Businesses
Starmaker (home video distributor), 1990s American entertainment company
StarMaker, American karaoke music app on iOS and Android based in China